Imminence or Imminent may refer to:
 Imminent lawless action, a standard currently used that was established by the United States Supreme Court in the case Brandenburg v. Ohio
 Imminent threat, justification for the use of force in international law
 Imminence (band), a Swedish metalcore band
 Imminent, a Belgian electronic noise music project including Szkieve

See also

Emergency management
Eminence (disambiguation)
Immanence, the divine encompasses or is manifested in the material world.
Predatory imminence continuum
Warning system